Natalie Golda (now Benson, born December 28, 1981) is a former American water polo player and currently the head coach of the newly formed Fresno State Bulldogs water polo team to begin competition in 2018. Considered one of the greatest women's water polo players of all time, her senior leadership helped guide the 2005 UCLA Bruins to their seventh national championship. In May 2005 Golda received the Peter J. Cutino Award, given to the best player in women's collegiate water polo. She was also a member of the US Water Polo Team that won the bronze medal at the 2004 Athens Olympics and the silver medal at the 2008 Beijing Olympics. In 2015, she was inducted into the USA Water Polo Hall of Fame.

She was born in Lakewood, California.

UCLA
Prior to entering college, Golda played varsity water polo for all four years at Rosary High School under head coach Todd Sprague. Her team won the California Interscholastic Federation title in 1998 and 1999. Golda was named First-Team All-Golden West League 1996–99. She lettered in softball for four years and volleyball for two.

Playing both defender and center forward positions, Golda won three NCAA championships with UCLA (2001, 2003, 2005). As a freshman in 2001, she helped the Bruins win the first women's water polo title recognized by the NCAA. In 2002, she earned Honorable Mention All-American honors and was named to the NCAA All-Tournament First-Team and All-MPSF (Mountain Pacific Sports Federation) Tournament Second Team. In 2003, Golda was named a first team All-American, first team All-MPSF, first team All-NCAA and All-MPSF Tournaments. She also led UCLA with 50 goals. To end her senior year at UCLA, Golda was selected the Most Outstanding Player of the NCAA Women's Water Polo Championship after leading her team to a 3-2 victory over Stanford in the title game. Golda scored the first goal of the contest in the championship game and then led a defensive effort that held the Cardinal to just two goals, including none in the first half. In the last 30 seconds of the game, the Bruin defense held off a 6-on-5 advantage to preserve the 3-2 win. Golda had four goals in the three tournament games.

The Cutino Award ended Golda's UCLA career on a high note after winning the 2005 NCAA's and leading UCLA to a perfect 33-0 record and an NCAA record 33-game winning streak.  Golda's other 2005 honors included:  American Water Polo Coaches Association Player of the Year, MPSF Conference Player of the Year, NCAA Tournament MVP and NCAA first tournament team. She finished the 2005 season with 47 goals and her career with 158 goals, third-most in UCLA history.

Golda joined other UCLA Bruins, Coralie Simmons (2001), Kelly Rulon (2007), and Courtney Mathewson (2008), as the school's four UCLA woman Peter J. Cutino Award winners, all coached by Adam Krikorian. She will be inducted into the UCLA Athletics Hall of Fame in 2016.

Olympics and international
Golda helped the US National Team win the 2003 Pan American Games in the Dominican Republic, qualifying the United States for Olympic water polo play at the Athens Olympiad in 2004. With her four tournament goals, the US team took gold at the 2003 FINA World Championships in Barcelona, Spain. In 2004, Golda redshirted to play in the 2004 Olympic games in Athens, Greece. She scored two goals, one against Hungary and another against Australia and helped the team win a bronze medal. In April 2006, she left for Greece to play for a club team in the League of European Nations, the ANC Glyfada team.

In February 2007, Golda was inducted into the New York Athletic Club (NYAC) Hall of Fame with fellow Olympic medalists Heather Moody and Nicolle Payne. The three women were members of the bronze medal 2004 U.S. Olympic team in Athens, and are the first women added to the NYAC Hall of Fame.

Golda and fellow UCLA Bruin Jaime Hipp are members of the USA water polo women's national team, which is ranked no. 1 in the world.

Golda was one of three returning players on the USA Olympic water polo team in the 2008 Beijing Olympics. In game one of the 2008 Olympics, Golda, the high scorer, led the team with 4 goals to a close 12-11 victory over Olympic newcomer China. Game two against defending gold medalist Italy ended in a draw after Italy managed to score a tying goal with only 22 seconds left in the game. The United States surged in game three against Russia with Golda scoring a team-leading 3 goals in a 12-7 defeat of Russia. In the Olympic semifinal, the U.S. women's water polo team beat Australia 9-8, with Golda scoring one goal and providing one assist.  Golda scored one goal in the championship game against the Netherlands and took home the silver medal from China.

Coaching
Golda was the head coach of the Huntington Beach Water Polo Club until August 2013 when she accepted the women's coach job at Division I Marist College in New York. She has since guided the Red Foxes to Metro Atlantic Athletic Conference Water polo regular season championships in 2015, and second-place finishes in the MAAC Conference Championships. Golda was named Anaconda Sports Coach of the Year in 2014, and has had five players named All-MAAC First team, six on All-MAAC Second Team, One MAAC Rookie of the Year and 10 All-MAAC Academic Team Honors over the course of two seasons. Benson (Golda) was then named the first head women's water polo coach at Fresno State, who began competition during the spring of 2018 [].

Personal
 Currently resides in Fresno, California, with her husband Eric Benson and her two daughters.
 Hobbies include writing, listening to music
 Favorite quote: "Life is too important to be taken seriously." – Oscar Wilde

See also
 United States women's Olympic water polo team records and statistics
 List of Olympic medalists in water polo (women)
 List of world champions in women's water polo
 List of World Aquatics Championships medalists in water polo

References

External links
 
 Natalie Golda's 2008 NBC Olympics blog
 UCLA team bio
 Natalie Golda's U.S. Olympic team bio
 Feature in 6/3/04 Daily Bruin
 Golda (and others) interviewed at 2004 Olympics
 USA Water Polo: Water Polo Olympic Medalists to be inducted into NYAC Hall of Fame.

1981 births
Living people
American female water polo players
Water polo players at the 2004 Summer Olympics
Water polo players at the 2008 Summer Olympics
Olympic silver medalists for the United States in water polo
Olympic bronze medalists for the United States in water polo
UCLA Bruins women's water polo players
Medalists at the 2008 Summer Olympics
World Aquatics Championships medalists in water polo
Medalists at the 2004 Summer Olympics
American water polo coaches
21st-century American women